The Australian Medical Council (AMC) is an independent national standards and assessment body for medical education and training. It was established in 1985.

Purpose 
The purpose of the AMC is:
"To ensure that standards of education, training and assessment of the medical profession promote and protect the health of the Australian community."

Functions 
The AMC's major functions include:
 accrediting medical education and training providers and their programs
 developing standards, policies and procedures for the accreditation of medical programs and for the assessment of international medical graduates seeking registration in Australia
 assessing the knowledge, clinical skills and professional attributes of overseas qualified medical practitioners seeking registration in medicine under the Health Practitioner Regulation National Law
 assessing the case for recognition of medical specialties
 giving advice and making recommendations to federal, state and territory governments and agencies, including medical regulatory authorities, in relation to
 accreditation and accreditation standards for the medical profession
 the registration of medical practitioners
 the assessment and recognition of overseas qualifications of medical practitioners
 the recognition of medical specialties.

Certification
AMC certification is required for international medical graduates (IMGs) who wish to be licensed in Australia. To achieve AMC certification, an IMG must pass the AMC MCQ Exam and the AMC Clinical exam, as well as having the medical diploma verified.
The AMC MCQ exam consists of 150 multiple choice questions (MCQs) organized through computer adaptive scoring. It is delivered in one 3.5 hour session. The pass mark is set to match the level of knowledge required by Australian medical schools for their final-year graduates. 
The AMC clinical exam consists of 16 stations. At each station the candidate has two minutes to read a presentation of a case and what tasks the candidate is expected to perform. Each station usually has three or four tasks. A task may include taking a focused medical history, performing a focused physical examination, suggesting differential diagnoses or further diagnostic procedures, or informing about treatments. A candidate then has eight minutes to perform the tasks, and is required to pass 12 out of 16 cases including one compulsory case in each of gynecology and pediatrics.

See also
List of medical schools in Australia
Australian Health Practitioner Regulation Agency

References

Further reading

External links
Australian Medical Council

Medical regulation in Australia
Medical and health organisations based in Australia
Medical education in Australia
1985 establishments in Australia